Issaka Hassane (born January 3, 1959) is a track and field sprint athlete who competed internationally for Chad

Hassane represented Chad at the 1984 Summer Olympics in Los Angeles. He competed in the 400 metres he ran the lap in 46.64 seconds but only came eighth in his heat so didn't progress to the next round.

References

1946 births
Living people
Chadian male sprinters
Olympic athletes of Chad
Athletes (track and field) at the 1984 Summer Olympics